Cerebellar hypoplasia (CH) is a neurological condition in which the cerebellum is smaller than usual or not completely developed.  It has been reported in many animal species.

Function and development of the cerebellum 
The cerebellum is the brain's main control center for planning, adjusting, and executing movements of the body, the limbs and the eyes. It plays a major role in several forms of motor learning, including balance and posture.

In the past, the evidence for a role for the cerebellum in cognitive functions was rather weak.  However, investigations into the cognitive neuroscience of the cerebellum are rapidly advancing, extending far beyond the traditional view. For humans, current theories support that what the cerebellum does to sensorimotor and vestibular control, it also does to cognition, emotion, and autonomic function.  How it functions in cognition, emotion, or autonomic function in animals is still largely unknown. In 2012, a  study in mice provided direct evidence that subtle disruptions in cerebellar architecture can have pronounced effects on behaviors typically associated with autistic-like behavior.

Development of the cerebellum starts in a fetus in utero and, depending on the species, may continue for some period after birth. Postnatal development periods vary by species including: dogs up to 75 days, cats to 84 days, calves up to six months.

Causes 
A hereditary link to CH has been established in some animals, including certain breeds of cows and dogs. 

There are numerous other potential causes for CH. It is suspected that the most common cause is animal parvoviruses.

Feline panleukopenia ("FPLV" : Feline Distemper or Feline Parvo) virus has long been known to cause cerebellar hypoplasia in neonatal kittens through in utero or perinatal infection.  In utero, the virus can pass from the dam to the developing fetus and may then disrupt the development of its cerebellum by hindering cell division. This can happen when the dam is actively infected with the virus or given a modified-live FPV vaccine when pregnant. Kittens are particularly vulnerable to CH, in particular when the protective antibodies present in their mothers' milk are no longer present at four to twelve weeks of age. Unvaccinated adult cats are also prone to developing the condition.

In most cases the cause is unknown. However, in dogs and cats it is thought to be most likely related to in utero viral infections, toxins or genetic disorders.

Other possible causes, if they occurred during the development period of the cerebellum and inhibit its growth, include:
 hypoxia
 Malnutrition, either from a lack of adequate critical nutrients or an inability to absorb them
 mycotic infection
 Protozoal infection (e.g.: toxoplasmosis)
 rickettsial infection (most are spread through ticks, mites, fleas, or lice)
 Traumatic brain injury
 Viral infection (e.g.: feline infectious peritonitis)

Signs

Levels of severity 
There is a very active U.S.A-based Facebook page for Cerebellar Hypoplasia Cats and Kittens ("Dogs and Puppies, too"). It has well over 10,000 members from locations all around the globe. The originating organization, chcat.org has been instrumental in introducing a rating scheme for CH cats that is widely accepted and used among its members.

What follows is based primarily on their rating scheme and on an adult cat's ability in its living environment. It does not reflect a neurological assessment of the actual damage to the cerebellum. Temporarily, during growth periods or when ill, stressed, or tired, a cat may seem slightly "worse" than usual.

This mild-to-severe rating should be viewed as a general guide and a scale. Cats may be described as very mild, mild, mild-moderate, moderate, moderate-severe, severe, extremely severe, and may, or may not, exhibit some or all of the following.

Diagnosis 
Numerous problems can be mistaken for CH. These include (but are not limited to):
 Ataxia: vestibular or sensory
 feline infectious peritonitis (FIP)
 lysosomal storage diseases

Treatment 
Special considerations:
 Anesthesia: In 2004, a study was published that linked ketamine to post-anesthetic cerebellar dysfunction in cats. 11 cats that did not have any indication of cerebellar deficits before surgery, did after. All of these cats were Persian crossbreeds. Ketamine can cause erratic and spastic, jerky movements and muscle tremors and is slow to be metabolized out of the system. Members of the CH Cat Facebook group routinely advise against its use. The 2018 American Association of Feline Practitioner's Feline Anesthesia Guidelines lists numerous alternatives. Gas anesthesia offers a number of advantages in many circumstances. In CH cats the rapid recovery is its primary advantage.

Prognosis 
If the root cause of the CH impacted other parts of the developing brain and/or body, the overall health and life-span may or may not be impacted. For instance, fetuses infected in utero by FPLV that survive, and kittens less than a few weeks of age that become infected with it, can also have retinal dysplasia, and optic neuropathy.

See also 
 Cerebellar hypoplasia - article on the condition as it occurs in human beings

References

Further reading

External links 
 Super Hero The Hydrocephalic Cat and Zeke. SHAHS Non Profit Rescue Society] /
 Feline Vestibular Syndrome
 Life with CH Cats
 Cerebellar Hypoplasia . Kitty Cat Chronicles
 The Handicapped Pets Foundation

Cat diseases
Dog diseases
Congenital disorders of nervous system
Neurological disorders